The Kojiki-den (古事記伝) is a 44-volume commentary on the Kojiki written by the kokugaku scholar Motoori Norinaga.

Overview 
The Kojiki-den is a commentary on the Kojiki, an eighth-century work of Shinto historiography and mythology, by the Edo period kokugaku scholar Motoori Norinaga.

Background 
Motoori Norinaga was attracted to Shinto, as well as waka and monogatari, from a young age. While studying in Kyoto in the seventh month of the sixth year of Hōreki (1756), he purchased a copy of the Kan'ei edition of the Kojiki, so it is thought that he read the work shortly after this point. His early writings following this date, such as the 1758 Aware Ben (安波礼弁) and Ashiwake Obune (排蘆小船) were more focused on the Nihon Shoki. In the 1761 Ame Tsuchi no Ben (阿毎菟知弁), he had moved toward placing more value on linguistic scholarship and attacked the Nihon Shokis Chinese for being a barrier to research into the ancient Japanese language.

Publication 
The Kojiki-den was completed in Kansei 10 (1798). It is in 44 books, first published in 44 volumes. The first five books were first printed in 1790, with books 6 through 11 following two years later. Books 12 through 17 were printed in 1797. The rest of the work was not published until Bunsei 5 (1822), after Norinaga's death. The first editions were printed in Nagoya by Eirakuya Tōshirō (永楽屋東四郎) and others.

Textual tradition 
The secondary manuscript for book 3 is in the holdings of the Tenri Central Library.

References

Works cited 

 

1798 non-fiction books
Motoori Norinaga
Kojiki
Edo-period works
Shinto texts